Blad Asha'abi Al-Allia is a sub-district located in al-Sabrah District, Ibb Governorate, Yemen. Blad Asha'abi Al-Allia had a population of 5432 according to the 2004 census.

References 

Sub-districts in As Sabrah District